Phyllonorycter retamella is a moth of the family Gracillariidae. It is known from Sicily and Tunisia.

Adults have been recorded on wing from May to June. There are two or more generations per year.

The larvae feed on Retama raetam. They mine the stem of their host plant.

References

retamella
Moths of Europe
Moths of Africa
Moths described in 1915